The Malabar Coast is the southwestern coast of the Indian subcontinent, generally referring to the coastline of Kerala. Geographically, it comprises the wettest regions of South India. The term sometimes is used to refer to the entire Indian coast from the western coast of Konkan to the tip of India at Kanyakumari. 

Kuttanad, which is the point of least elevation in India, lies on the Malabar Coast. Kuttanad, also known as The Rice Bowl of Kerala, has the lowest altitude in India, and is one of the few places in the world where cultivation takes place below sea level. 

The region parallel to the Malabar Coast gently slopes from the eastern highland of Western Ghats ranges to the western coastal lowland. The moisture-laden winds of the Southwest monsoon, on reaching the southernmost point of the Indian Peninsula, because of its topography, divides into two branches; the "Arabian Sea Branch" and the "Bay of Bengal Branch". The "Arabian Sea Branch" of the Southwest monsoon first hits the Western Ghats, making Kerala the first state in India to receive rain from the Southwest monsoon. The Malabar Coast is a source of Biodiversity in India.

Etymology

Until the arrival of the British, the term Malabar was used in foreign trade circles as a general name for Kerala. Earlier, the term Malabar had also been used to denote Tulu Nadu and Kanyakumari which lie contiguous to Kerala in the southwestern coast of India, in addition to the modern state of Kerala. The people of Malabar were known as Malabars. The term Malabar is often used to denote the entire southwestern coast of India. 

From the time of Cosmas Indicopleustes (6th century CE) itself, the Arab sailors used to call Kerala Male. The first element of the name, however, is attested already in the Topography written by Cosmas Indicopleustes. This mentions a pepper emporium called Male, which clearly gave its name to Malabar ('the country of Male'). The name Male is thought to come from the Malayalam word Mala ('mountain'). The second part of the name is thought by scholars to be the Arabic word barr ('continent') or its Persian relative bar ('country'). 

Al-Biruni (AD 973 - 1048) must have been the first writer to call this state Malabar. Authors such as Ibn Khordadbeh and Al-Baladhuri mention Malabar ports in their works. The Arab writers had called this place Malibar, Manibar, Mulibar, and Munibar. Malabar is reminiscent of the word Malanad which means the land of mountains. 

According to William Logan, the word Malabar comes from a combination of the Malayalam word Mala (mountain) and the Persian/Arabic word Barr (country/continent).

Definitions

The term Malabar Coast, in historical contexts, refers to India's southwestern coast, which lies on the narrow coastal plain of Karnataka and Kerala between the Western Ghats range and the Arabian Sea. The coast runs from south of Goa to Kanyakumari on India's southern tip. India's southeastern coast is called the Coromandel Coast.

In ancient times the term Malabar was used to denote the entire south-western coast of the Indian peninsula. The region formed part of the ancient kingdom of Chera until the early 12th century. Following the breakup of the Chera Kingdom, the chieftains of the region proclaimed their independence. Notable among these were the Zamorins of Calicut, Kolathiris, Perumbadappu Swaroopam, Venad, the Coylot Wanees Country of northeast and coastal Ceylon (including Puttalam), Valluvokonathiris of Valluvanad.

The name Malabar Coast is sometimes used as an all-encompassing term for the entire Indian coast from Konkan to the tip of the subcontinent at Kanyakumari. It is flanked by the Arabian Sea on the west and the Western Ghats on the east. The southern part of this narrow coast is referred to as the South Western Ghats moist deciduous forests.

Malabar is also used by ecologists to refer to the tropical and subtropical moist broadleaf forests of southwestern India (present-day Kerala).

Geography

Geographically, the Malabar Coast can be divided into three climatically distinct regions: the eastern highlands; rugged and cool mountainous terrain, the central mid-lands; rolling hills, and the western lowlands; coastal plains.

The Western Ghats mountain range which lie parallel to the coast on the eastern highland and separate the plains from the Deccan Plateau. These mountains recognised as one of the world's eight "hottest hotspots" of biological diversity and is listed among UNESCO World Heritage Sites. The chain's forests are considered to be older than the Himalaya mountains.

Malabar's western coastal belt is relatively flat compared to the eastern region, and is criss-crossed by a network of interconnected brackish canals, lakes, estuaries, and rivers known as the Kerala Backwaters. The Kuttanad region, also known as The Rice Bowl of Kerala, has the lowest altitude in India. Around eight percent of India's waterways are found in Kerala.

Physical geography

The term Malabar Coast is sometimes used as an all-encompassing term for the entire Indian coast from the western coast of Konkan to the tip of the subcontinent at Cape Comorin. It is over 525 miles or 845  kilometers long. It spans from the south-western coast of Maharashtra and goes along the coastal region of Goa, through the entire western coast of Karnataka and Kerala and reaches till Kanyakumari. It is flanked by the Arabian Sea on the west and the Western Ghats on the east. The Southern part of this narrow coast is the South Western Ghats moist deciduous forests. Climate-wise, the Malabar Coast, especially on its westward-facing mountain slopes, comprises the wettest region of southern India, as the Western Ghats intercept the moisture-laden Southwest monsoon rains.

Malabar rainforests

The Malabar rainforests include these ecoregions recognized by biogeographers:

 the Malabar Coast moist forests formerly occupied the coastal zone, up to the 250 meters in elevation (but 95% of these forests no longer exist)
 the South Western Ghats moist deciduous forests grow at intermediate elevations
 the South Western Ghats montane rain forests cover the areas above 1000 meters

The Monsooned Malabar coffee bean comes from this area.

Port cities

The Malabar Coast featured (and in some instances still does) several historic port cities. Notable among these were/are Naura, Vizhinjam, Muziris, Nelcynda, Beypore and Thundi (near Ponnani or Kadalundi) during ancient times, and Kozhikode (Calicut), Kollam, Ponnani, Kannur (Cannanore), and Cochin in the medieval period, and have served as centers of the Indian Ocean trade for millennia.

Because of their orientation to the sea and to maritime commerce, the Malabar coast cities feel very cosmopolitan, and have been home to some of the first groups of Jews (known today as Cochin Jews), Syrian Christians (known as Saint Thomas Christians), Muslims (presently known as Mappilas), and Anglo-Indians in India.

History

Prehistory
A substantial portion of the Malabar Coast including the western coastal lowlands and the plains of the midland may have been under the sea in ancient times. Marine fossils have been found in an area near Changanassery, thus supporting the hypothesis. Pre-historical archaeological findings include dolmens of the Neolithic era in the Marayur area of the Idukki district, which lie on the eastern highland made by Western Ghats. Rock engravings in the Edakkal Caves, in Wayanad date back to the Neolithic era around 6000 BCE.

Ancient and medieval history

The Malabar Coast has been a major spice exporter since 3000 BCE, according to Sumerian records and it is still referred to as the "Garden of Spices" or as the "Spice Garden of India". Kerala's spices attracted ancient Arabs, Babylonians, Assyrians and Egyptians to the Malabar Coast in the 3rd and 2nd millennia BCE. Phoenicians established trade with Malabar during this period. Arabs and Phoenicians were the first to enter the Malabar Coast to trade Spices. The Arabs on the coasts of Yemen, Oman, and the Persian Gulf, must have made the first long voyage to Malabar and other eastern countries. They must have brought the Cinnamon of Malabar to the Middle East. The Greek historian Herodotus (5th century BCE) records that in his time the cinnamon spice industry was monopolized by the Egyptians and the Phoenicians.

According to the Periplus of the Erythraean Sea, a region known as Limyrike began at Naura and Tyndis. However, the Ptolemy mentions only Tyndis as the Limyrike'''s starting point. The region probably ended at Kanyakumari; it thus roughly corresponds to the present-day Malabar Coast. The value of Rome's annual trade with the region was estimated at 50,000,000 sesterces. Pliny the Elder mentioned that Limyrike was prone by pirates. The Cosmas Indicopleustes mentioned that the Limyrike was a source of Malabar peppers.Das, Santosh Kumar (2006). The Economic History of Ancient India. Genesis Publishing Pvt Ltd. p. 301.  In the last centuries BCE the coast became important to the Greeks and Romans for its spices, especially Malabar pepper. The Cheras had trading links with China, West Asia, Egypt, Greece, and the Roman Empire. In foreign-trade circles the region was known as Male or Malabar. Muziris, Tyndis, Naura (near Kannur), and Nelcynda were among the principal ports at that time. contemporary Sangam literature describes Roman ships coming to Muziris in Kerala, laden with gold to exchange for Malabar pepper. One of the earliest western traders to use the monsoon winds to reach Kerala was Eudoxus of Cyzicus, around 118 or 166 BCE, under the patronage of Ptolemy VIII, king of the Hellenistic Ptolemaic dynasty in Egypt. Roman establishments in the port cities of the region, such as a temple of Augustus and barracks for garrisoned Roman soldiers, are marked in the Tabula Peutingeriana, the only surviving map of the Roman cursus publicus.

The term Kerala was first epigraphically recorded as Ketalaputo'' (Cheras) in a 3rd-century BCE rock inscription by emperor Ashoka of Magadha. It was mentioned as one of four independent kingdoms in southern India during Ashoka's time, the others being the Cholas, Pandyas and Satyaputras. The Cheras transformed Kerala into an international trade centre by establishing trade relations across the Arabian Sea with all major Mediterranean and Red Sea ports as well those of the Far East. The dominion of Cheras was located in one of the key routes of the ancient Indian Ocean trade. The early Cheras collapsed after repeated attacks from the neighboring Cholas and Rashtrakutas. 

During the early Middle Ages, Namboodiri Brahmin immigrants arrived in Kerala and shaped the society on the lines of the caste system. In the 8th century, Adi Shankara was born at Kalady in central Kerala. He travelled extensively across the Indian subcontinent founding institutions of the widely influential philosophy of Advaita Vedanta. The Cheras regained control over Kerala in the 9th century until the kingdom was dissolved in the 12th century, after which small autonomous chiefdoms, most notably the Kingdom of Kozhikode, arose. The 13th century Venetian explorer, Marco Polo, would visit and write of his stay in the province. The port at Kozhikode acted as the gateway to medieval South Indian coast for the Chinese, the Arabs, the Portuguese, the Dutch, and finally the British.

In 1498, Vasco Da Gama established a sea route to Kozhikode during the Age of Discovery, which was also the first modern sea route from Europe to South Asia, and raised Portuguese settlements, which marked the beginning of the colonial era of India. European trading interests of the Dutch, French and the British East India companies took centre stage during the colonial wars in India. Travancore became the most dominant state in Kerala by defeating the powerful Zamorin of Kozhikode in the battle of Purakkad in 1755. After the Dutch were defeated by Travancore king Marthanda Varma, the British crown gained control over Kerala through the creation of the Malabar District in northern Kerala and by allying with the newly created princely state of Travancore in the southern part of the state until India was declared independent in 1947. The state of Kerala was created in 1956 from the former state of Travancore-Cochin, the Malabar district and the Kasaragod taluk of South Canara District of Madras state.

British colonialism: Malabar District

After the Anglo-Mysore wars, the parts of the Malabar Coast, those became British colonies, were organized into a district of British India. The British district included the present-day districts of Kannur, Kozhikode, Wayanad, Malappuram, much of Palakkad (Excluding Chittur taluk), some parts of Thrissur (Chavakkad Taluk), and the Fort Kochi region of Ernakulam district, besides the isolated islands of Lakshadweep. The administrative headquarters was at Kozhikode.

Malabar District, a part of the ancient Malabar (or Malabar Coast) was a part of the British East India Company-controlled state. It included the northern half of the state of Kerala and the islands of Lakshadweep. Kozhikode is considered as the capital of Malabar. The area was divided into two categories as North and South. North Malabar comprises present Kasaragod and Kannur Districts, Mananthavady Taluk of Wayanad District and Vatakara and Koyilandy Taluks of Kozhikode District. The left-over area is South Malabar aka Eranad Taluk which comes under present Malappuram District, Palakkad District and Chavakkad taluk of Thrissur district.

During the British rule, the Malabar's chief importance laid in producing pepper, tiles, and Coconut. In the old administrative records of the Madras Presidency, it is recorded that the most remarkable plantation owned by Government in the erstwhile Madras Presidency was the Teak plantation at Nilambur planted in 1844. The District of Malabar and the ports at Beypore and Fort Kochi had some sort of importance in the erstwhile Madras Presidency as it was one of the two districts of the Presidency that lies on the Western Malabar Coast, thus accessing the marine route through Arabian Sea. The first railway line of Kerala from Tirur to Beypore in 1861 was laid for it.

After Indian independence
With India's independence, Madras presidency became Madras State, which was divided along linguistic lines on 1 November 1956, whereupon Kasaragod region was merged with the Malabar immediately to the north and the state of Travancore-Cochin to the south to form the state of Kerala. Before that, Kasaragod was a part of South Canara district of Madras Presidency. Lakshadweep Islands were separated to form a new union territory.

See also

 Coromandel Coast
 Dutch Malabar
 Kerala Backwaters
 Kollam Parappu (Quilon bank)
 List of rivers of Kerala
 Ma'bar Coast
 Malabar (disambiguation)
 Malabar District
 Malabar pepper
 Malabars
 Portuguese Empire
 Portuguese India
 Thalassery cuisine

References

Further reading

External links 
 
 

 
Coasts of India
Landforms of Karnataka
Landforms of Kerala
Regions of India
Regions of Kerala